The Felistas Fable is a 2013 Ugandan film written, directed and produced by Dilman Dila. The film stars Veronica Namanda, Mike Wawuyo, Kaddzu Isaac and Mathew Nabwiso.

Plot
Felistas is cursed. She stinks. No one can stand to stay near her. She lives in seclusion in an abandoned house. One day, a witchdoctor finds a solution to her problems. A cry-baby man can inherit the smell from her. Felistas is hesitant to grab the opportunity, because she does not want another person to go through the same pain she has endured. But she longs to reunite with her husband and child. So she kidnaps a man, Dan, who is a virgin desperate to get married. Dan recently got a job that makes him very rich. This attracts the attention of Kate, a gold-digger who he has wooed for a long time, and that of a corrupt cop, Jomba, who frames him for murder in an extortion scheme. As Felistas races against time to deliver Dan to the witch and win back her husband’s love, it turns into a high-energy chase with a voluptuous Kate and a trigger-happy Jomba hot on her tail.

Cast
Veronica Namanda as Felistas
 Kuddzu Isaac as Dan
 Tibba Murungi as Kate
Gerald Rutaro as Jomba
Joanitta Bewulira-Wandera as Mama Dan
Raymond Kayemba as Kiza
Michael Wawuyo as Kuku
Esther Bwanika as Miria
Gamba Lee as John
Nandaula Zam Zam as Jean
Wilberforce Mutetete as Police
Oyugi Jackson Otim as Driver
Mathew Nabwiso as Fred
Opio Henry Opolot as Ogwang
Mate Jackson as Priest
Juliet Akanyijuka as Hr
Kyarisiima Allen as Junior
 Nalubowa Aidah as Vendor
Wagaba Dauda as Idler
Mataze Charles as Spy
 Kazibwe Edwin as Son

Critical reception
The Felistas Fable won two nominations at the Africa Movie Academy Awards for Best First Feature by a Director, and for Best Make-up Artist. It was also nominated for the African Magic Viewers Choice Awards 2014 for Best Make-up Artist. It won four awards at the Uganda Film Festival Awards 2014, for (Best Screenplay), (Best Actor),(Best Feature Film), and (Best Director/Film of the Year).

Awards
Winner of Film of the Year (Best Director) at the Uganda Film Festival 2014.
Winner of Best Feature Film at the Uganda Film Festival 2014 
Winner of Best Screenplay at the Uganda Film Festival 2014 
Winner best actor (Kuddzu Isaac)at the Uganda Film Festival 2014  
Winner overall film of the year at the Uganda Film Festival 2014. 
Nominated for Best First Feature by a Director at the Africa Movie Academy Awards 2014
Nominated for Best Make-up Artist at the Africa Movie Academy Awards 2014 and at the African Magic Views Choice Awards, 2014

References

External links 
"The Felistas Fable"
"After one week of shooting The Felistas Fable "
"The Felistas Fable"
"Who are Uganda’s best film stars?"
"Uganda Film Festival 2014 Nominees"

2013 films
Kumusha
2010s English-language films